The Pedirka Desert is a small Australian desert, about  north-west of Oodnadatta and  north-east of Coober Pedy in South Australia.  Mount Dare and Witjira National Park are just to the north.

Pedirka Desert belongs to the Finke bioregion.  The sands are deep-red and it is vegetated by dense mulga woodlands.  Dunes in the desert are low, eroded, widely spaced and positioned parallel to each other.

Although the land is not over-appealing to pastoralists, it is progressively being developed.

See also

Deserts of Australia
List of deserts by area

References

External links
Pedirka Desert at Bonzle

Deserts of South Australia
Far North (South Australia)